Nihat Şahin (born 15 September 1989) is a Turkish footballer who last played as a goalkeeper for Gazişehir Gaziantep.

Nihat made his Süper Lig debut for Sivasspor on 2 February 2012.

References

External links
 
 

1989 births
Living people
Footballers from İzmir
Turkish footballers
Sivasspor footballers
Mersin İdman Yurdu footballers
Gençlerbirliği S.K. footballers
Süper Lig players
Association football goalkeepers